The list of Texas State University alumni includes notable alumni of Texas State University.

Politics and government
 Rosalyn Baker, Hawaii State Senator, District 6
 Buddy Garcia, interim 2012 member of the Texas Railroad Commission

 Lyndon B. Johnson (Class of 1930), 36th US President
 David M. Medina, justice on the Supreme Court of Texas, 2004-2013
 James Oakley, County Judge for Burnet County
 John Sharp, Texas A&M University System Chancellor
 Dwayne Stovall, businessman in Cleveland, Texas, school board member, and Republican candidate for the United States Senate in the primary election scheduled for March 4, 2014
 Catalina Vasquez Villalpando (attended but did not graduate), US Treasurer

Military
 Robert L. Rutherford, former General in the United States Air Force, former commander of United States Transportation Command

Music
 Maggie Heath, member of folk rock duo The Oh Hellos
 Emilio Navaira, country/Tejano singer
 Kyle Park, country singer
 Charlie Robison, country singer
 Randy Rogers, country singer
 Tommy Bolton, Dan Buie, Gerry Gibson and Bill Pennington of Roy Head and The Traits, Rockabilly Hall of Fame band members
 George Strait, country singer
 Sunny Sweeney, country singer
 Jamestown Revival
 S U R V I V E

Media
 G. W. Bailey, actor
 Powers Boothe, actor
 Thomas Carter, film director
 Aaryn Gries, Big Brother 15 contestant, 8th place
 Edi Patterson, actress
 Chelcie Ross, actor
 Tracy Scoggins, actress
Alexis Texas, AVN award winner and pornographic actress

Journalism
 E. R. Bills (author), author and journalist.
 Heloise, columnist
Julian S. Garcia,writer, editor and op-ed writer for SAn Antonio Express-News, AP News and contributor-editor to ViAztlan: International Journal of Arts and Letters; and contributor to Caracol. 
 Tomás Rivera, writer
 Maria Luisa Tucker writer
 Meg Turney, Internet news host

Sports
 Charles Austin, Olympic high jump gold medalist
 Joplo Bartu, Former NFL Player
 Edgar Baumann, Olympic javelin thrower 
 Torgeir Bryn former NBA player
 Wayne Coffey, football player
 Fred Evans, former NFL player
 Kyle Finnegan, MLB pitcher
 Jeff Foster, former NBA player
 Paul Goldschmidt, MLB first baseman
 Donnie Hart, MLB pitcher
 Lance Hoyt, professional wrestler
 A.J. Johnson, former NFL player
 Wade Key, former NFL player
Tony Levine (born 1972), football coach
 Scott Linebrink, former MLB pitcher
 Craig Mager, American football player
 David Mayo, American football player
 Shawn Michaels, professional wrestler
 Darryl Morris, cornerback, NFL, Indianapolis Colts
 Jeff Novak, former NFL player
 Ricky Sanders, former NFL player
 Carson Smith, pitcher, Major League Baseball, Boston Red Sox
 Mitchell Ward, football player
 Bobby Watkins, NFL player
 Spergon Wynn former NFL player

Art

 Charles Barsotti, cartoonist
 Griffon Ramsey, chainsaw artist

Education
 Light Townsend Cummins,  Bryan Professor of History at Austin College in Sherman, Texas; former official State Historian of Texas
 F. Ann Millner, Weber State University president

Business
 Rod Keller, president of Segway Inc.

Medicine
 Michael Glyn Brown, former hand surgeon

Notable alumni gallery

References

Texas State University alumni